Generalissimo is a military rank of the highest degree, superior to field marshal and other five-star ranks in the states where they are used.

Usage
The superlative suffix  itself derives from Latin , meaning "utmost, to the highest grade".

Historically this rank was given to a military officer leading an entire army or the entire armed forces of a state, usually only subordinate to the sovereign. The military leader Albrecht von Wallenstein in 1632 was the first imperial generalissimo (general of the generals). Other usage of the rank has been for the commander of the united armies of several allied powers and if a senior military officer becomes the head of state or head of government of a nation like Chiang Kai-Shek in China and later in Taiwan, and Francisco Franco in Spain.

The rank generalissimus of the Soviet Union would have been a generalissimo but some sources assert that Joseph Stalin refused to accept the rank. In fact the grade was established by the Presidium of the Supreme Soviet which did not need the "approval" of Stalin. The rank of generalissimo for Stalin was used also by Western diplomacy.

In the 20th century, the term came to be associated with military officers who took dictatorial power in their countries, especially due to the Spanish Francisco Franco having this rank. As such, it is used in literature depicting fictional Latin American dictatorial regimes, for example Father Hilary's Holiday by Bruce Marshall.

List of generalissimos

Gallery

See also
Admiralissimo
 Capo dei capi
Caudillo
Commander-in-chief
Grand marshal
Da yuan shuai
Dai-gensui
Field marshal
General of the Armies
Generalissimus of the Soviet Union
Highest military ranks
Shogun
Six-star rank

Notes

References

 
Positions of authority
Military ranks
Italian words and phrases